Inveralligin is a remote crofting township which lies on the north shore of Loch Torridon in Wester Ross and is in the Scottish council area of Highland. Inbhir Àiliginn means "at the mouth of the River Alligin".

Alligin Shuas lies immediately to the west. This name is also of Gaelic origin: alligin may be from àilleag meaning "jewel" and shuas means "western" or "upper".

References

Populated places in Ross and Cromarty
Torridon